Lee Hyeon-ju (born 30 July 1953) is a South Korean figure skater. She competed in the ladies' singles event at the 1968 Winter Olympics.

References

1953 births
Living people
South Korean female single skaters
Olympic figure skaters of South Korea
Figure skaters at the 1968 Winter Olympics
Figure skaters from Seoul